Quintana Roo, officially the Free and Sovereign State of Quintana Roo, is one of the 31 states which, with Mexico City, constitute the 32 federal entities of Mexico. It is divided into 11 municipalities and its capital city is Chetumal.

Quintana Roo is located on the eastern part of the Yucatán Peninsula and is bordered by the states of Campeche to the west and Yucatán to the northwest, and by the Orange Walk and Corozal districts of Belize, along with an offshore borderline with Belize District to the south. As Mexico's easternmost state, Quintana Roo has a coastline to the east with the Caribbean Sea and to the north with the Gulf of Mexico. The state previously covered  and shared a small border with Guatemala in the southwest of the state. However, in 2013, Mexico's Supreme Court of Justice of the Nation resolved the boundary dispute between Quintana Roo, Campeche, and Yucatán stemming from the creation of the Calakmul municipality by Campeche in 1997, siding with Campeche and thereby benefiting Yucatán.

Quintana Roo is the home of the city of Cancún, the islands of Cozumel and Isla Mujeres, and the towns of Bacalar, Playa del Carmen and Akumal, as well as the ancient Maya ruins of Chacchoben, Cobá, Kohunlich, Muyil, Tulum, Xel-Há, and Xcaret. The Sian Ka'an biosphere reserve is also located in the state. The statewide population is expanding at a rapid rate due to the construction of hotels and the demand for workers. Many migrants come from Yucatán, Campeche, Tabasco, and Veracruz.

History

The area that makes up modern Quintana Roo was long part of Yucatán, sharing its history. With the Caste War of Yucatán, which started in the 1840s, all non-natives were driven from the region. The independent Maya nation of Chan Santa Cruz was based on what is now the town of Felipe Carrillo Puerto. For decades it maintained considerable independence, having separate trade and treaty relationships with British Honduras, now Belize.

Quintana Roo was made a territory of Mexico by decree of President Porfirio Díaz on November 24, 1902. It was named after an early patriot of the Mexican Republic, Andrés Quintana Roo. The Mexican army succeeded in defeating most of the Maya population of the region during the 1910s. In 1913 the area was again declared to be legally part of the state of Yucatán, but was again declared a separate territory in 1915. The territory of Quintana Roo was granted statehood within the United Mexican States on October 8, 1974.  

In the last quarter of the 20th century and continuing into the 21st, Quintana Roo developed rapidly, with tourism being a driving force, notably with the development of Cancún.

Archaeological findings 
Ancient human remains have been discovered in a system of submerged caves and sinkholes in the Tulum area of Quintana Roo. To date, a total of nine skeletons have been found in these caves, including one of the oldest human skeletons found on the American continent. In 2016, underwater archaeological exploration of a cave known as Chan Hol found a skeleton of a female who lived in the region at least 9,900 years ago, during the Paleo-Indian period. Dating revealed that the skeleton was probably about 30 years old at the time of death. According to craniometric measurements, the skull is believed to conform to the mesocephalic pattern, like three other skulls found in Tulum caves. Three different scars on the skull of the woman showed that she was hit with something hard and her skull bones were broken. Her skull also had crater-like deformations and tissue deformities that appeared to be caused by a bacterial relative of syphilis.

According to study lead researcher Wolfgang Stinnesbeck, "It really looks as if this woman had a very hard time and an extremely unhappy end of her life. Obviously, this is speculative, but given the traumas and the pathological deformations on her skull, it appears a likely scenario that she may have been expelled from her group and was killed in the cave, or was left in the cave to die there”.

Although archaeologists assumed the 2016 expedition had re-discovered Chan Hol 2, Stinnesbeck concluded that the two skeletons represent different individuals.

Due to their distinctive features, study co-researcher Samuel Rennie suggest the existence of at least two morphologically diverse groups of people living separately in Mexico during the transition from Pleistocene to Holocene.

Geography

Climate
According to the Köppen climate classification, much of the state has a tropical wet and dry climate (Aw) while the island of Cozumel has a tropical monsoon climate (Am). Quintana Roo averages  of precipitation per year, which falls throughout the year, though June to October are the wetter months. Hurricanes can occasionally hit the coastal areas during the hurricane season, particularly from September to November. 2020 was a historic year for hurricanes in Quintana Roo, with a record-breaking 31 tropical systems formed, of which four affected the state.

Flora and fauna

Demographics

Municipalities

The State of Quintana Roo is divided into 11 municipalities, each headed by a municipal president:

Bacalar
Benito Juarez
Othón P. Blanco
Puerto Morelos
Cozumel
Felipe Carrillo Puerto
Isla Mujeres
Solidaridad
Tulum
José María Morelos
Lázaro Cárdenas

Tourism

Tourism

Quintana Roo's tourist boom began in the 1970s. Tourism resulted in the development of coastal hotels and resorts, in addition to ecotourism inland and in coastal regions, which have increased the development of the region as well as the gross domestic product.  Quintana Roo ranks sixth among Mexican states according to the United Nations Human Development index (HDI).

The Riviera Maya is located along the Caribbean coastline, including Cancún, Playa del Carmen, Puerto Morelos, Akumal and Cozumel.

There are a number of Mayan archeological sites in Quintana Roo, including Chacchoben, Coba, Kohunlich, Muyil, San Gervasio, Tulum, Xcaret, Xelha, and Yo'okop.

Biotic situation of the Yucatán Peninsula
The Yucatán Peninsula is one of the most forested areas of the world in terms of biotic mass per hectare.  However, anthropological, biological and governmental experts have determined that Quintana Roo is 'facing a faunal crisis'.  Many medium to large game animals are disappearing due to hunting and habitat loss. While its population is relatively small, Quintana Roo is experiencing both a population influx and an increase in tourism. This only increases the pressure on the plants and animals native to the area.

Ecosystems and animals
There are four generalized ecosystems in Quintana Roo—tropical forests, or jungle; savanna, mangrove forests, and coral reefs.  One of the byproducts of traditional and large-scale agriculture is the creation of additional habitats, such as second growth forests and fields/pastures.  Tourism has caused Quintana Roo to become famous around the world in the last thirty or so years for its beaches, coastline, and cenote sinkholes. Biological experts consider the coastline of Quintana Roo one of the best manatee habitats worldwide.  Queen conchs are also noted for their inhabitation of coastal territory.  The wide variety of biotic organisms such as these has decreased drastically in the last fifteen years.

Avifauna
Also affected by the loss of habitat due to both agriculture and development, birds are one of the region's most varied animal assets.  Hundreds of species reside in Quintana Roo permanently, with hundreds of others either wintering there or using it as a stopover on the long journey into South America.  As a result, many birders come to the area annually in search of the rare and unexpected.

Impact

Many blame the environmental damage in Quintana Roo on either the regional government or outside investors.  However, resorts and hotels in Quintana Roo have created jobs and increased economic activity, which in turn has resulted in growth.

Projections for the tourism economy of Quintana Roo were exceedingly optimistic.  It houses multiple tourist attractions from the Maya ruins to the lush forests and beautiful beaches.  However, the long-term effects were not foreseen.  The effect on the local environment was not properly considered.  Economic stresses of development and population were virtually ignored.  The effect on the native population was not properly considered.  The 'economic marginalization' of the Maya has had drastic effects on their sense of place and identity.

Education

Universities
Instituto Tecnológico de Cancún, Cancún
Instituto Tecnológico de Chetumal, Chetumal
University of Quintana Roo, Chetumal
Intercultural Maya University of Quintana Roo, José María Morelos
Universidad Anáhuac Cancún, Cancún
Universidad del Caribe, Cancún
Universidad Tecnológica de la Riviera Maya, Playa del Carmen
Universidad La Salle Cancún, Cancún
Universidad TecMilenio, Cancún

Media
Newspapers of Quintana Roo include: Diario de Quintana Roo, Diario Respuesta, El Periódico de Quintana Roo, El Quintanarroense, Novedades de Quintana Roo, and Por Esto!

Sports

Soccer club Atlante F.C. was founded in 1916 in Mexico City and moved to Cancun in 2007 due to poor attendance. During its years in Mexico City, the team played in Liga MX, Mexico’s premier pro soccer league. In June 2020, a possible move of Atlante F.C. began to be speculated. On June 26, the relocation of that club to Mexico City became official. The same day, however, the relocation of Cafetaleros de Chiapas was announced, moving to Cancún and rebranding as Cancún F.C. They play in the Mexican second division Liga de Expansión MX at Estadio Andrés Quintana Roo.

In addition to soccer, the city has a professional baseball team, known as the Quintana Roo Tigers. After playing the 1955–2001 seasons in Mexico City and the 2002–2005 seasons in Puebla, the Tigers have been playing baseball with a home field at the Estadio de Béisbol Beto Ávila in Cancún since the 2006 season. The Tigers made it to the Mexican League series of baseball (analogous to MLB’s World Series) in 2009, but lost to the Saraperos de Saltillo 4 games to 2.

Time zone
On February 1, 2015, Quintana Roo officially adopted a new time zone, Southeastern, which is five hours behind Coordinated Universal Time (UTC−05:00). Quintana Roo does not observe daylight saving time, so Southeastern Time is constant throughout the year (that is, it does not shift forward in the spring and back in the fall). Southeastern Time (ST) is the same as Eastern Standard Time (EST) and Central Daylight Time (CDT). This means that in the winter, Quintana Roo has the same time as regions observing EST, such as the eastern U.S., eastern Canada, Cuba, and Jamaica; and in the summer, Quintana Roo has the same time as regions observing CDT, such as central Mexico.

Quintana Roo changed to Southeastern Time for economic reasons, including:

 Allowing tourists in areas such as Cancun, Cozumel, and Playa del Carmen to spend more time (and money) at beaches, restaurants, historic sites, and other venues.
 Reducing electricity usage by hotels, restaurants, and other facilities.

Before Quintana Roo adopted the Southeastern time zone (officially referred to as zona sureste in Mexico), it had been part of the Central time zone (zona centro).

See also
Cenote

Notes

References
Dumond, Don E.1985 The Talking Crosses of Yucatán: A New Look at their History. Ethnohistory 32(4):291–308.
Freidel, David., Schele, Linda., et al. 1993 Maya Cosmos: Three thousand years on the Shaman's Path. New York: W. Morrow
Harrison, Peter D. 1985 Some Aspects of Preconquest Settlement in Southern Quintana Roo, Mexico. Lowland Maya Settlement Patterns edited by Wendy Ashmore Albuquerque: University of New Mexico Press, A School of American Research Book.
Villa Rojas, Alfonso.  1945 The Maya of East Central Quintana Roo: The Pagan-Christian Religious Complex. Washington, D.C.: Carnegie Institution.

Further reading
Anderson, E. N. and Felix Medina Tzuc.  Animals and the Maya in Southeast Mexico.  University of Arizona Press.  Tucson, Arizona.  2005.
Brannon, Jeffery T. and Gilbert M. Joseph. Eds. 1991 Land, labor & capital in modern Yucatán: essays in regional history and political economy. Tuscaloosa: University of Alabama Press.
Barton Bray, David, Marcelo Carreon, Leticia Merino, and Victoria Santos.  "On the Road to Sustainable Forestry: The Maya of Quintana Roo are Striving to Combine Economic Efficiency, Ecological Sustainability, and a Democratic Society."  Cultural Survival Quarterly 17.1, 38–41.  1993.
Daltabuit, Magali and Oriol Pi-Sunyer.  1990.  Tourism Development in Quintana Roo, Mexico.  Cultural Survival Quarterly 14.2, 9-13.  Cultural Survival
Dumond, Don E. 1997 The Machete and the Cross. Campesino Rebellion in Yucatán. Lincoln and London: University of Nebraska Press.
Encyclopædia Britannica 2008. Quintana Roo. Encyclopædia Britannica, Inc. Accessed 2008-02-21.
Forero, Oscar A. and Michael R. Redclift. "The Role of the Mexican State in the Development of Chicle Extraction in Yucatán, and the Continuing Importance of Coyotaje." Journal of Latin American Studies 38.1, 65–93. 2006.
Gabbert, Wolfgang.  Becoming Maya—Ethnicity and Social Inequality in Yucatán Since 1500.  University of Arizona Press.  Tucson, Arizona.  2004.
Hervik, Peter.  Mayan People Within and Beyond Boundaries—Social Categories and Lived Identity in Yucatán.  Harwood Academic Publishers.  Amsterdam, The Netherlands.  1999.
Jones, Grant D.  Maya Resistance to Spanish Rule—Time and History on a Colonial Frontier.  University of New Mexico Press.  Albuquerque, New Mexico.  1989.
Juarez, Ana M.  2002.  "Ecological Degradation, Global Tourism, and Inequality: Maya Interpretations of the Changing Environment in Quintana Roo, Mexico".  Human Organization 61.2, 113–124.
Morely, Sylvanus Griswold. The Ancient Maya.  Stanford University Press.  Stanford, California.  1947.
Morely, Sylvanus Griswold and George W. Brainerd.  The Ancient Maya, 3rd ed.  Stanford University Press.  Stanford, California.  1956.
Pi-Sunyer, Oriol and R. Brooke Thomas.  1997.  Tourism, Environmentalism, and Cultural Survival in Quintana Roo.  "In" Life and Death Matters: Human Rights at the End of the Millennium.  Barbara R. Johnston, ed.  p. 187-212.  Walnut Creek, California.  Altamira Press.
Roys, Ralph L.  The Political Geography of the Yucatán Maya.  Carnegie Institution of Washington Publication 613.  Washington, D. C.  1957.
Rugeley, Terry. 2004 "Yaxcabá and the caste war of Yucatán: An Archaeological Perspective" In Alexander, Rani T. ed. Yaxcabá and the caste war of Yucatán Albuquerque: University of New Mexico Press
Schlesinger, Victoria.  Animals and Plants of the Ancient Maya: A Guide.  University of Texas Press.  Austin, Texas.  2001.
Sharer, Robert J.  The Ancient Maya, 4th ed.  Stanford University Press.  Stanford, California.  1983.
Villa Rojas, Alfonso.  The Maya of East Central Quintana Roo.  Carnegie Institute of Washington Publication 559.  Washington, D. C.  1945.
Young, Peter A, ed.  Secrets of the Maya.  Hatherleigh Press.  Long Island City, New York.  2003
Link to tables of population data from Census of 2005 INEGI: Instituto Nacional de Estadística, Geografía e Informática

External links

 
 Quintana Roo State Government official website 

 
States of Mexico
Yucatán Peninsula
1974 establishments in Mexico
States and territories established in 1974